Omari J. Hardy (born November 28, 1989) is an American politician and former member of the Florida House of Representatives from the 88th district. He assumed office on November 3, 2020 and left in January 2022 following a congressional election defeat.

Early life and education 
Hardy was born in Fort Lauderdale, Florida. He earned a Bachelor of Arts degree in economics from the University of Miami.

Career 
Hardy previously worked as an educator, and served as a member of the Lake Worth Beach, Florida City Commission. In March 2020, a Youtube video of  an emergency commission meeting, in which Hardy sparred with then Lake Worth Beach Mayor Pam Triolo, went viral. Prior to his election to the Florida House of Representatives in November 2020, Hardy resigned from the commission to remain on the general election ballot. During debate in the House Chambers, Hardy drew statewide attention when he stated that Republican Representative Michelle Salzman called Republican Representative Webster Barnaby a "token black republican."

2022 congressional special election 

In April 2021, Hardy announced his candidacy for Florida's 20th congressional district in a special election to succeed Alcee Hastings, who had passed away earlier that month after a multi-year battle with pancreatic cancer. Hardy ran on a progressive platform, pledging support for Medicare for All and the Green New Deal.

Hardy declared his support for the boycott, divestment and sanctions of Israel, stating "...You have to speak the truth. You have to be clear about the difference between right and wrong" and indicated support for Palestinians. The centrist pro-Israel group Democratic Majority for Israel released campaign ads accusing Hardy of antisemitism because of his support for Boycott, Divestment, and Sanctions and his opposition to funding for the Iron Dome, an Israeli air defense system.

Hardy was defeated, garnering just under 6% of the vote.

References

External links 

Florida House of Representatives - Omari Hardy
Campaign website

Living people
1989 births
People from Fort Lauderdale, Florida
University of Miami alumni
Democratic Party members of the Florida House of Representatives
People from Lake Worth Beach, Florida
21st-century American politicians
21st-century African-American politicians
African-American state legislators in Florida
20th-century African-American people
Candidates in the 2021 United States elections